I'm Your Empress Of is the third studio album by American singer-songwriter and producer Empress Of, released via Terrible Records and XL Recordings on April 3, 2020. The album's first single "Give Me Another Chance" premiered on March 3, 2020, via Zane Lowe's Beats 1 radio show.

Composition
On her third album, Empress Of crafts "breathtaking" avant-pop, "energetic" dance-pop, dream pop, and "funky" R&B. It also shows a Chicago house-inspired wonky pop style.

Track listing
All tracks written by Empress Of, except for "Hold Me Like Water", written alongside Mikey "Ex Reyes" Hart.

References

2020 albums
Terrible Records albums
XL Recordings albums
Empress Of albums